Sardinian or Sard (or  ) is a Romance language spoken by the Sardinians on the Western Mediterranean island of Sardinia.

Many Romance linguists consider it the language that is closest to Latin among all its genealogical descendants. However, it has also incorporated elements of a Pre-Latin (mostly Paleo-Sardinian and, to a much lesser degree, Punic) substratum, as well as a Byzantine Greek, Catalan, Castilian, and Italian superstratum. These elements originate in the political history of Sardinia, whose indigenous society experienced for centuries competition and at times conflict with a series of colonizing newcomers: before the Middle Ages, the island was for a time a Byzantine possession; then, after a significant period of self-rule with the Judicates, when Sardinian was officially employed in accordance with documentary testimonies, it came during the late Middle Ages into the Iberian sphere of influence, during which Catalan and Castilian became the island's prestige languages and would remain so well into the 19th century; and finally, from the early 18th century onward, under the Savoyard and contemporary Italian one, following since then the country's linguistic policies which, to the detriment of Sardinian and the local Catalan, led to diglossia.

The original character of the Sardinian language among the Romance idioms has long been known among linguists. After a long strife for the acknowledgement of the island's cultural patrimony, in 1997, Sardinian, along with the other languages spoken therein, managed to be recognized by regional law in Sardinia without challenge by the central government, and in 1999, Sardinian and eleven other "historical linguistic minorities", i.e. locally indigenous, and not foreign-grown, minority languages of Italy (as defined by the legislator) were similarly recognized as such by national law (specifically, Law No. 482/1999). Among these, Sardinian is notable as having, in terms of absolute numbers, the largest community of speakers.

Although the Sardinian-speaking community can be said to share "a high level of linguistic awareness", policies eventually fostering language loss and assimilation have considerably affected Sardinian, whose actual speakers have become noticeably reduced in numbers over the last century; The Sardinian adult population would today no longer be able to carry on a single conversation in the ethnic language, as it is used exclusively by 0.6 percent of the total, and less than 15 percent of the new generations were reported to have been passed down some residual Sardinian in a deteriorated form described by linguist Roberto Bolognesi as "an ungrammatical slang". 

The rather fragile and precarious state in which the Sardinian language now finds itself, where its use has been discouraged and consequently reduced even within the family sphere, is illustrated by the Euromosaic report, in which Sardinian "is in 43rd place in the ranking of the 50 languages taken into consideration and of which were analysed (a) use in the family, (b) cultural reproduction, (c) use in the community, (d) prestige, (e) use in institutions, (f) use in education".

As the Sardinians have almost completely assimilated into the Italian national mores, including in terms of onomastics, and therefore now only happen to keep but a scant and fragmentary knowledge of their native and once first spoken language, limited in both scope and frequency of use, Sardinian has been classified by UNESCO as "definitely endangered". In fact, the intergenerational chain of transmission appears to have been broken since at least the 1960s, in such a way that the younger generations, who are predominantly Italian monolinguals, do not identify themselves with the indigenous tongue, which is now reduced to the memory of "little more than the language of their grandparents".

As the long- to even medium-term future of the Sardinian language looks far from secure in the present circumstances, Martin Harris concluded in 2003 that, assuming the continuation of present trends to language death, it was possible that there would not be a Sardinian language of which to speak in the future, being referred to by linguists as the mere substratum of the now-prevailing idiom, i.e. Italian articulated in its own Sardinian-influenced variety, which may come to wholly supplant the islanders' once living native tongue.

Overview

As an insular language par excellence, Sardinian is considered the most conservative Romance language, as well as one of the most highly individual within the family; its substratum (Paleo-Sardinian or Nuragic) has also been researched. In the first written testimonies, dating to the eleventh century, Sardinian appears as a language already distinct from the dialects of Italy. A 1949 study by the Italian-American linguist Mario Pei, analyzing the degree of difference from a language's parent (Latin, in the case of Romance languages) by comparing phonology, inflection, syntax, vocabulary, and intonation, indicated the following percentages (the higher the percentage, the greater the distance from Latin): Sardinian 8%, Italian 12%, Spanish 20%, Romanian 23.5%, Occitan 25%, Portuguese 31%, and French 44%. The significant degree to which the Sardinian language has retained its Latin base was also noted by the French geographer Maurice Le Lannou during a research project on the island in 1941.

Although the lexical base is mostly of Latin origin, Sardinian nonetheless retains a number of traces of the linguistic substratum prior to the Roman conquest of the island: several words and especially toponyms stem from Paleo-Sardinian and, to a lesser extent, Phoenician-Punic. These etyma might refer to an early Mediterranean substratum, which reveal close relations with Basque.

In addition to the aforementioned substratum, linguists such as Max Leopold Wagner and Benvenuto Aronne Terracini trace much of the distinctive Latin character of Sardinia to the languoids once spoken by the Christian and Jewish Berbers in North Africa, known as African Romance. Indeed, Sardinian was perceived as rather similar to African Latin when the latter was still in use, giving credit to the theory that vulgar Latin in both Africa and Sardinia displayed a significant wealth of parallelisms. J. N. Adams is of the opinion that similarities in many words, such as acina (grape), pala (shoulderblade) and spanu(s) ("reddish-brown"), prove that there might have been a fair amount of vocabulary shared between Sardinia and Africa. According to Wagner, it is notable that Sardinian is the only Romance language whose name for the Milky Way ("the Way of Straw") also recurs in the Berber languages.

To most Italians Sardinian is unintelligible, reminding them of Spanish, because of the way in which the language is acoustically articulated; characterized as it is by a sharply outlined physiognomy which is displayed from the earliest sources available, it is in fact considered a distinct language, if not an altogether different branch, among the Romance idioms; George Bossong summarises thus: "be this as it may, from a strictly linguistic point of view there can be no doubt that Sardinian is to be classified as an independent Romance language, or even as an independent branch inside the family, and so it is classed alongside the great national languages like French and Italian in all modern manuals of Romance linguistics".

History

Sardinia's relative isolation from mainland Europe encouraged the development of a Romance language that preserves traces of its indigenous, pre-Roman language(s). The language is posited to have substratal influences from Paleo-Sardinian, which some scholars have linked to Basque and Etruscan; comparisons have also been drawn with the Berber languages from North Africa to shed more light on the language(s) spoken in Sardinia prior to its Romanization. Subsequent adstratal influences include Catalan, Spanish, and Italian. The situation of the Sardinian language with regard to the politically dominant ones did not change until fascism and, most evidently, the 1950s.

Origins of modern Sardinian
Prenuragic and Nuragic era

The origins of ancient Sardinian, also known as Paleo-Sardinian, are currently unknown. Research has attempted to discover obscure, indigenous, pre-Romance roots. The root s(a)rd, indicating many place names as well as the island's people, is reportedly either associated with or originating from the Sherden, one of the Sea Peoples.

In 1984, Massimo Pittau claimed to have found the etymology of many Latin words in the Etruscan language, after comparing it with the Nuragic language(s). Etruscan elements, formerly thought to have originated in Latin, would indicate a connection between the ancient Sardinian culture and the Etruscans. According to Pittau, the Etruscan and Nuragic language(s) are descended from Lydian (and therefore Indo-European) as a consequence of contact with Etruscans and other Tyrrhenians from Sardis as described by Herodotus. Although Pittau suggests that the Tirrenii landed in Sardinia and the Etruscans landed in modern Tuscany, his views are not shared by most Etruscologists.

According to Bertoldi and Terracini, Paleo-Sardinian has similarities with the Iberic languages and Siculian; for example, the suffix -ara in proparoxytones indicated the plural. Terracini proposed the same for suffixes in -, -/ànna/, -/énna/, -/ònna/ +  + a paragogic vowel (such as the toponym Bunnànnaru). Rohlfs, Butler and Craddock add the suffix - (such as the toponym Barùmini) as a unique element of Paleo-Sardinian. Suffixes in /a, e, o, u/ + -rr- found a correspondence in north Africa (Terracini), in Iberia (Blasco Ferrer) and in southern Italy and Gascony (Rohlfs), with a closer relationship to Basque (Wagner and Hubschmid). However, these early links to a Basque precursor have been questioned by some Basque linguists. According to Terracini, suffixes in -, -, -, and - are common to Paleo-Sardinian and northern African languages. Pittau emphasized that this concerns terms originally ending in an accented vowel, with an attached paragogic vowel; the suffix resisted Latinization in some place names, which show a Latin body and a Nuragic suffix. According to Bertoldi, some toponyms ending in - and -/asài/ indicated an Anatolian influence. The suffix -/aiko/, widely used in Iberia and possibly of Celtic origin, and the ethnic suffix in -/itanos/ and -/etanos/ (for example, the Sardinian Sulcitanos) have also been noted as Paleo-Sardinian elements (Terracini, Ribezzo, Wagner, Hubschmid and Faust).

Some linguists, like Max Leopold Wagner (1931), Blasco Ferrer (2009, 2010) and Arregi (2017) have attempted to revive a theoretical connection with Basque by linking words such as Sardinian idile "marshland" and Basque itil "puddle"; Sardinian ospile "fresh grazing for cattle" and Basque hozpil "cool, fresh"; Sardinian arrotzeri "vagabond" and Basque arrotz "stranger"; Sardinian golostiu and Basque gorosti "holly"; Gallurese (Corso-Sardinian) zerru "pig" (with z for [dz]) and Basque zerri (with z for [s]). Genetic data have found the Basques to be close to the Sardinians.

Since the Neolithic period, some degree of variance across the island's regions is also attested. The Arzachena culture, for instance, suggests a link between the northernmost Sardinian region (Gallura) and southern Corsica that finds further confirmation in the Natural History by Pliny the Elder. There are also some stylistic differences across Northern and Southern Nuragic Sardinia, which may indicate the existence of two other tribal groups (Balares and Ilienses) mentioned by the same Roman author. According to the archeologist Giovanni Ugas, these tribes may have in fact played a role in shaping the current regional linguistic differences of the island.

Classical period

Around the 10th and 9th century BC, Phoenician merchants were known to have made their presence in Sardinia, which acted as a geographical mediator in between the Iberian and the Italian peninsula. In the eighth and seventh centuries, the Phoenicians began to develop permanent settlements, politically arranged as city-states in similar fashion to the Lebanese coastal areas. It did not take long before they started gravitating around the Carthaginian sphere of influence, whose level of prosperity spurred Carthage to send a series of expeditionary forces to the island; although they were initially repelled by the natives, the North African city vigorously pursued a policy of active imperialism and, by the sixth century, managed to establish its political hegemony and military control over South-Western Sardinia. Punic began to be spoken in the area, and many words entered ancient Sardinian as well. Words like giara ‘plateau’ (cf. Hebrew yaʿar ‘forest, scrub’), g(r)uspinu ‘nasturtium’ (from Punic cusmin), curma ‘fringed rue’ (cf. Arabic ḥarmal ‘Syrian rue’), mítza ‘spring’ (cf. Hebrew mitsa, metza ‘source, fountainhead’), síntziri ‘marsh horsetail’ (from Punic zunzur ‘common knotgrass’), tzeúrra ‘sprout’ (from *zerula, diminutive of Punic zeraʿ ‘seed’), tzichirìa ‘dill’ (from Punic sikkíria; cf. Hebrew šēkār ‘ale’) and tzípiri ‘rosemary’ (from Punic zibbir) are commonly used, especially in the modern Sardinian varieties of the Campidanese plain, while proceeding northwards the influence is more limited to place names, such as the town of Magomadas, Macumadas in Nuoro or Magumadas in Gesico and Nureci, all of which deriving from the Punic maqom hadash "new city".

The Roman domination began in 238 BC, but was often contested by the local Sardinian tribes, who had by then acquired a high level of political organization, and would manage to only partly supplant the pre-Latin Sardinian languages, including Punic. Although the colonists and negotiatores (businessmen) of strictly Italic descent would later play a relevant role in introducing and spreading Latin to Sardinia, Romanisation proved slow to take hold among the Sardinian natives, whose proximity to the Carthaginian cultural influence was noted by Roman authors. Punic continued to be spoken well into the 3rd–4th century AD, as attested by votive inscriptions, and it is thought that the natives from the most interior areas, led by the tribal chief Hospito, joined their brethren in making the switch to Latin around the 7th century AD, through their conversion to Christianity. Cicero, who loathed the Sardinians on the ground of numerous factors, such as their outlandish language, their kinship with Carthage and their refusal to engage with Rome, would call the Sardinian rebels latrones mastrucati ("thieves with rough wool cloaks") or Afri ("Africans") to emphasize Roman superiority over a population mocked as the refuse of Carthage. 

A number of obscure Nuragic roots remained unchanged, and in many cases Latin accepted the local roots (like nur, presumably cognate of Norax, which makes its appearance in nuraghe, Nurra, Nurri and many other toponyms). Barbagia, the mountainous central region of the island, derives its name from the Latin Barbaria (a term meaning "Land of the Barbarians", similar in origin to the now antiquated word "Barbary"), because its people refused cultural and linguistic assimilation for a long time: 50% of toponyms of central Sardinia, particularly in the territory of Olzai, are actually not related to any known language. According to Terracini, amongst the regions in Europe that went on to draw their language from Latin, Sardinia has overall preserved the highest proportion of pre-Latin toponyms. Besides the place names, on the island there are still a few names of plants, animals and geological formations directly traceable to the ancient Nuragic era.

By the end of the Roman domination, Latin had gradually become however the speech of most of the island's inhabitants. As a result of this protracted and prolonged process of Romanisation, the modern Sardinian language is today classified as Romance or neo-Latin, with some phonetic features resembling Old Latin. Some linguists assert that modern Sardinian, being part of the Island Romance group, was the first language to split off from Latin, all others evolving from Latin as Continental Romance. In fact, contact with Rome might have ceased from as early as the first century BC. In terms of vocabulary, Sardinian retains an array of peculiar Latin-based forms that are either unfamiliar to, or have altogether disappeared in, the rest of the Romance-speaking world.

The number of Latin inscriptions on the island is relatively small and fragmented.

After a period of 80 years under the Vandals, Sardinia would again be part of the Byzantine Empire under the Exarchate of Africa for almost another five centuries. Luigi Pinelli believes that the Vandal presence had "estranged Sardinia from Europe, linking its own destiny to Africa's territorial expanse" in a bond that was to strengthen further "under Byzantine rule, not only because the Roman Empire included the island in the African Exarchate, but also because it developed from there, albeit indirectly, its ethnic community, causing it to acquire many of the African characteristics" that would allow ethnologists and historians to elaborate the theory of the Paleo-Sardinians' supposed African origin, now disproved. Casula is convinced that the Vandal domination caused a "clear breaking with the Roman-Latin writing tradition or, at the very least, an appreciable bottleneck" so that the subsequent Byzantine government was able to establish "its own operational institutions" in a "territory disputed between the Greek- and the Latin-speaking world".

Despite a period of almost five centuries, the Greek language only lent Sardinian a few ritual and formal expressions using Greek structure and, sometimes, the Greek alphabet. Evidence for this is found in the condaghes, the first written documents in Sardinian. From the long Byzantine era there are only a few entries but they already provide a glimpse of the sociolinguistical situation on the island in which, in addition to the community's everyday Neo-Latin language, Greek was also spoken by the ruling classes. Some toponyms, such as Jerzu (thought to derive from the Greek khérsos, "untilled"), together with the personal names Mikhaleis, Konstantine and Basilis, demonstrate Greek influence.

Judicates period

As the Muslims made their way into North Africa, what remained of the Byzantine possession of the Exarchate of Africa was only the Balearic Islands and Sardinia. Pinelli believes that this event constituted a fundamental watershed in the historical course of Sardinia, leading to the definitive severance of those previously close cultural ties between Sardinia and the southern shore of the Mediterranean: any previously held commonality shared between Sardinia and Africa “disappeared, like mist in the sun, as a result of North Africa's conquest by Islamic forces, since the latter, due to the fierce resistance of the Sardinians, were not able to spread to the island, as they had in Africa”. Michele Amari, quoted by Pinelli, writes that "the attempts of the Muslims of Africa to conquer Sardinia and Corsica were frustrated by the unconquered valour of the poor and valiant inhabitants of those islands, who saved themselves for two centuries from the yoke of the Arabs".

As the Byzantines were fully focused on reconquering southern Italy and Sicily, which had in the meanwhile also fallen to the Muslims, their attention on Sardinia was neglected and communications broke down with Constantinople; this spurred the former Byzantine province of Sardinia to become progressively more autonomous from the Byzantine oecumene, and eventually attain independence. Pinelli argues that "the Arab conquest of North Africa separated Sardinia from that continent without, however, causing the latter to rejoin Europe" and that this event "determined a capital turning point for Sardinia, giving rise to a de facto independent national government". Historian Marc Bloch believed that, owing to Sardinia being a country which found itself in "quasi-isolation" from the rest of the continent, the earliest documentary testimonies, written in Sardinian, were much older than those first issued in Italy.

Sardinian was the first Romance language of all to gain official status, being used by the four Judicates, former Byzantine districts that became independent political entities after the Arab expansion in the Mediterranean had cut off any ties left between the island and Byzantium. The exceptionality of the Sardinian situation, which in this sense constitutes a unique case throughout the Latin-speaking Europe, consists in the fact that any official text was written solely in Sardinian from the very beginning and completely excluded Latin, unlike what was happening – and would continue to happen – in France, Italy and Iberia at the same time; Latin, although co-official, was in fact used only in documents concerning external relations in which the Sardinian kings (judikes, "judges") engaged. Awareness of the dignity of Sardinian for official purposes was such that, in the words of Livio Petrucci, a Neo-Latin language had come to be used "at a time when nothing similar can be observed in the Italian peninsula" not only "in the legal field" but also "in any other field of writing".

A diplomatic analysis of the earliest Sardinian documents shows that the Judicates provided themselves with chanceries, which employed an indigenous diplomatic model for writing public documents; one of them, dating to 1102, displays text in half-uncial, a script that had long fallen out of use on the European continent and F. Casula believes may have been adopted by the Sardinians of Latin culture as their own "national script" from the 8th until the 12th century, prior to their receiving outside influence from the arrival of mainly Italian notaries.

Old Sardinian had a greater number of archaisms and Latinisms than the present language does, with few Germanic words, mostly coming from Latin itself, and even fewer Arabisms, which had been imported by scribes from Iberia; in spite of their best efforts with a score of expeditions to the island, from which they would get considerable booty and a hefty number of Sardinian slaves, the Arab assailants were in fact each time forcefully driven back and would never manage to conquer and settle on the island.

Although the surviving texts come from such disparate areas as the north and the south of the island, Sardinian then presented itself in a rather homogeneous form: even though the orthographic differences between Logudorese and Campidanese Sardinian were beginning to appear, Wagner found in this period "the original unity of the Sardinian language". In agreement with Wagner is Paolo Merci, who found a "broad uniformity" around this period, as were Antonio Sanna and Ignazio Delogu too, for whom it was the islanders' community life that prevented Sardinian from localism. According to Carlo Tagliavini, these earlier documents show the existence of a Sardinian Koine which pointed to a model based on Logudorese.

According to Eduardo Blasco Ferrer, it was in the wake of the fall of the Judicates of Cagliari and Gallura, in the second half of the 13th century, that Sardinian began to fragment into its modern dialects, undergoing some Tuscanization under the rule of the Republic of Pisa; it did not take long before the Genoese too started carving their own sphere of influence in northern Sardinia, both through the mixed Sardinian-Genoese nobility of Sassari and the members of the Doria family. A certain range of dialectal variation is then noted.

A special position was occupied by the Judicate of Arborea, the last Sardinian kingdom to fall to foreign powers, in which a transitional dialect was spoken, that of Middle Sardinian. The Carta de Logu of the Kingdom of Arborea, one of the first constitutions in history drawn up in 1355–1376 by Marianus IV and the Queen, the "Lady Judge" ( in Sardinian,  in Catalan,  in Italian) Eleanor, was written in this transitional variety of Sardinian, and would remain in force until 1827.

Dante Alighieri wrote in his 1302–05 essay De vulgari eloquentia that Sardinians were strictly speaking not Italians, even though they appeared superficially similar to them, and they did not speak anything close to a Neo-Latin language of their own, but resorted to aping straightforward Latin instead. Dante's view on the Sardinians, however, is proof of how their language had been following its own course in a way which was already unintelligible to non-islanders, and had become, in Wagner's words, an impenetrable "sphinx" to their judgment. Frequently mentioned is a previous 12th-century poem by the troubadour Raimbaut de Vaqueiras, Domna, tant vos ai preiada ("Lady, so much I have endeared you"); Sardinian epitomizes outlandish speech therein, along with non-Romance languages such as German and Berber, with the troubadour having the lady say "" ("I don't understand you more than a German or Sardinian or Berber"); the Tuscan poet Fazio degli Uberti refers to the Sardinians in his poem  as "" ("a people that no one is able to understand / nor do they come to a knowledge of what other peoples say about them").

The Muslim geographer Muhammad al-Idrisi, who lived in Palermo, Sicily at the court of King Roger II, wrote in his work  ("The book of pleasant journeys into faraway lands" or, simply, "The book of Roger") that "Sardinians are ethnically , like the Berbers; they shun contacts with all the other  nations and are people of purpose and valiant that never leave the arms". According to Wagner, the close relationship in the development of Vulgar Latin between North Africa and Sardinia might not have only derived from ancient ethnic affinities between the two populations, but also from their common political past within the Exarchate of Africa.

The first document containing Sardinian elements is a 1063 donation to the abbey of Montecassino signed by Barisone I of Torres. Another such document (the so-called Carta Volgare) comes from the Judicate of Cagliari and was issued by Torchitorio I de Lacon-Gunale in around 1070, written in Sardinian whilst still employing the Greek alphabet. Other documents are the 1080 "Logudorese Privilege", the 1089 Torchitorius' Donation (in the Marseille archives), the 1190–1206 Marsellaise Chart (in Campidanese Sardinian) and an 1173 communication between the Bishop Bernardo of Civita and Benedetto, who oversaw the Opera del Duomo in Pisa. The Statutes of Sassari (1316) and Castelgenovese (c. 1334) are written in Logudorese Sardinian.

The first chronicle in lingua sive ydiomate sardo, called , was published anonymously in the 13th century, relating the events of the Judicate of Torres.

Iberian period – Catalan and Castilian influence

The 1297 feoffment of Sardinia by Pope Boniface VIII led to the creation of the Kingdom of Sardinia: that is, of a state which, although lacking in summa potestas, entered by right as a member in personal union within the broader Mediterranean structure of the Crown of Aragon.

The war had, among its motives, a never dormant and ancient Arborean political design to establish "a great island nation-state, wholly indigenous" which was assisted by the massive participation of the rest of the Sardinians, i.e. those not residing within the jurisdiction of Arborea (Sardus de foras), as well as a widespread impatience with the foreign importation of a feudal regime, specifically "" and "", which threatened the survival of deep-rooted indigenous institutions and, far from ensuring the return of the island to a unitary regime, had only introduced there "tot reges quot sunt ville" ("as many petty rulers as there are villages").

The conflict between the two sovereign and warring parties, during which the Aragonese possessions making up the Kingdom of Sardinia were first administratively split into two separate "halves" by Peter IV the Ceremonious in 1355, ended after sixty-seven years with the Iberian victory at Sanluri in 1409 and the renunciation of any succession right signed by William II of Narbonne in 1420. This event marked the definitive end of Sardinian independence, whose historical relevance for the island, likened by Francesco C. Casula to "the end of Aztec Mexico", should be considered "neither triumph nor defeat, but the painful birth of today's Sardinia".

From that moment, "". 

Casula believes that the Aragonese winners from the brutal conflict would then move on to destroy the pre-existing documentary production of the still living Sardinian Judicate, which was predominantly written in Sardinian language along with other ones the chancery was engaged with, leaving behind their trail only "a few stones" and, overall, a "small group of documents", many of which are in fact still preserved and/or refer to archives outside the island. Specifically, the Arborean documents and the palace in which they were kept would be completely set on fire on May 21, 1478, as the viceroy triumphantly entered Oristano after having tamed the aforementioned 1478 rebellion, which threatened the revival of an Arborean identity which had been de jure abolished in 1420 but was still very much alive in popular memory.

Thereafter, the ruling class in Sardinia proceeded to adopt Catalan as their primary language. Alghero is still a Catalan-speaking enclave on Sardinia to this day. Nevertheless, the Sardinian language did not disappear from official use: the Catalan juridical tradition in the cities coexisted with that of the Sardinians, marked in 1421 by the Parliamentary extension of the Arborean  to the feudal areas during the Reign of King Alfonso the Magnanimous, and Sardinian continued to be used in documents pertaining to administrative and ecclesiastical spheres until the late 17th century. Fara, in the same first modern monograph dedicated to Sardinia, reported the lively multilingualism in "one and the same people", because of immigration "by Spaniards and Italians" who came to the island to trade with the native Sardinians.

The long-lasting war and the so-called Black Death had a devastating effect on the island, depopulating large parts of it. People from the neighbouring island of Corsica, which had been already Tuscanised, began to settle en masse in the northern Sardinian coast, leading to the birth of Sassarese and then Gallurese, two Italo-Dalmatian lects.

Despite Catalan being widely spoken and written on the island at this time (leaving a lasting influence in Sardinian), there are written records of Sardinian, one of which is the 15th-century , written by Antòni Canu (1400–1476) and published in 1557.

The 16th century is instead marked by a new literary revival of Sardinian, which was estimated to be the native people's ordinary language by the Jesuits in 1561. , by Hieronimu Araolla, was aimed at "glorifying and enriching Sardinian, our language" as the Spanish, French and Italian poets had already done for their own languages ( and ). This way, Araolla is one of the first Sardinian authors to bind the language to a Sardinian nation, the existence of which is not outright stated but naturally implied. Antonio Lo Frasso, a poet born in Alghero (a city he remembered fondly) who spent his life in Barcelona, wrote lyric poetry in Sardinian.

"namely Latins, Pisans, Genoese, Spanish, and Africans"), Arquer pointed to there being many Sardinian words with apparently no traceable origin and reported that Sardinians nevertheless "understand each other perfectly".

Especially through the reorganization of the monarchy led by the Count-Duke of Olivares, Sardinia would gradually join a broad Spanish cultural sphere. Spanish was perceived as an elitist language, gaining solid ground among the ruling Sardinian class; Spanish had thus a profound influence on Sardinian, especially in those words, styles and cultural models owing to the prestigious international role of the Habsburg monarchy as well as the Court. Most Sardinian authors would write in both Spanish and Sardinian until the 19th century and were well-versed in the former, like Vicente Bacallar y Sanna that was one of the founders of the Real Academia Española; according to Bruno Anatra's estimates, around 87% of the books printed in Cagliari were in Spanish. A notable exception was Pedro Delitala (1550–1590), who decided to write in Italian instead. Nonetheless, the Sardinian language retained much of its importance, earning respect from the Spaniards in light of it being the ethnic code the people from most of the Kingdom kept using, especially in the interior.

Sardinian was also one of the few official languages, along with Spanish, Catalan and Portuguese, whose knowledge was required to be an officer in the Spanish tercios.

Ioan Matheu Garipa, a priest from Orgosolo who translated the Italian  into Sardinian in 1627, was the first author to claim that Sardinian was the closest living relative of classical Latin and, like Araolla before him, valued Sardinian as the language of a specific ethno-national community. In this regard, the philologist Paolo Maninchedda argues that by doing so, these authors did not write "about Sardinia or in Sardinian to fit into an island system, but to inscribe Sardinia and its language – and with them, themselves – in a European system. Elevating Sardinia to a cultural dignity equal to that of other European countries also meant promoting the Sardinians, and in particular their educated countrymen, who felt that they had no roots and no place in the continental cultural system".

Savoyard period – Italian influence

The War of the Spanish Succession gave Sardinia to Austria, whose sovereignty was confirmed by the 1713–14 treaties of Utrecht and Rastatt. In 1717 a Spanish fleet reoccupied Cagliari, and the following year Sardinia was ceded to Victor Amadeus II of Savoy in exchange for Sicily. The Savoyard representative, the Count of Lucerna di Campiglione, received the definitive deed of cession from the Austrian delegate Don Giuseppe dei Medici, on condition that the "rights, statutes, privileges of the nation" that had been the subject of diplomatic negotiations were preserved. The island thus entered the Italian orbit after the Iberian one, although this transfer would not initially entail any social nor cultural and linguistic changes: Sardinia would still retain for a long time its Iberian character, so much so that only in 1767 were the Aragonese and Spanish dynastic symbols replaced by the Savoyard cross. Until 1848, the Kingdom of Sardinia would in fact technically remain an island state with its own traditions and institutions, albeit without summa potestas and in personal union as an overseas possession of the House of Savoy.

The Sardinian language, although practiced in a state of diglossia, continued to be spoken by all social classes, its linguistic alterity and independence being universally perceived; Spanish, on the other hand, was the prestige code known and used by the Sardinian social strata with at least some education, in so pervasive a manner that Joaquín Arce refers to it in terms of a paradox: Castilian had become the common language of the islanders by the time they officially ceased to be Spanish and, through their annexation by the House of Savoy, became Italian through Piedmont instead. Given the current situation, the Piedmontese ruling class which held the reins of the island, in this early phase, resolved to maintain its political and social institutions, while at the same time progressively hollowing them out as well as "treating the [Sardinian] followers of one faction and of the other equally, but keeping them divided in such a way as to prevent them from uniting, and for us to put to good use such rivalry when the occasion presents itself".

According to Amos Cardia, this pragmatic stance was rooted in three political reasons: in the first place, the Savoyards did not want to rouse international suspicion and followed to the letter the rules dictated by the Treaty of London, signed on 2 August 1718, whereby they had committed themselves to respect the fundamental laws of the newly acquired Kingdom; in the second place, they did not want to antagonize the hispanophile locals, especially the elites; and finally, they lingered on hoping they could one day manage to dispose of Sardinia altogether, while still keeping the title of Kings by regaining Sicily. In fact, since imposing Italian would have violated one of the fundamental laws of the Kingdom, which the new rulers swore to observe upon taking on the mantle of King, Victor Amadeus II emphasised the need for the operation to be carried out through incremental steps, small enough to go relatively unnoticed, as early as 1721. Such prudence was again noted, when the King claimed that he was nevertheless not intentioned to ban either Sardinian or Spanish on two separate occasions, in 1726 and 1728.

In the same year, Victor Amadeus II had already said he could no longer tolerate the lack of ability to speak Italian on the part of the islanders, in view of the inconveniences that such inability was putting through for the functionaries sent from the Mainland. Restrictions to mixed marriages between Sardinian women and the Piedmontese officers dispatched to the island, which had hitherto been prohibited by law, were at one point lifted and even encouraged so as to better introduce the language to the local population.

Eduardo Blasco Ferrer argues that, in contrast to the cultural dynamics long established in the Mainland between Italian and the various Romance dialects thereof, in Sardinia the relationship between the Italian language – recently introduced by Savoy – and the native one had been perceived from the start by the locals, educated and uneducated alike, as a relationship (albeit unequal in terms of political power and prestige) between two very different languages, and not between a language and one of its dialects. The plurisecular Iberian period had also contributed in making the Sardinians feel relatively detached from the Italian language and its cultural sphere; local sensibilities towards the language were further exacerbated by the fact that the Spanish ruling class had long considered Sardinian a distinct language, with respect to their own ones and Italian as well.

However, the Savoyard government eventually decided to directly introduce Italian altogether to Sardinia on the conventional date of 25 July 1760, because of the Savoyards' geopolitical need to draw the island away from Spain's gravitational pull and culturally integrate Sardinia into the orbit of the Italian peninsula, through the thorough assimilation of the island's cultural models, which were deemed by the Savoyard functionaries as "foreign" and "inferior", to Piedmont. In fact, the measure in question prohibited, among other things, "the unreserved use of the Castilian idiom in writing and speaking, which, after forty years of Italian rule, was still so deeply rooted in the hearts of the Sardinian teachers". In 1764, the exclusive imposition of the Italian language was finally extended to all sectors of public life, including education, in parallel with the reorganisation of the Universities of Cagliari and Sassari, which saw the arrival of personnel from the Italian mainland, and the reorganisation of lower education, where it was decided likewise to send teachers from Piedmont to make up for the lack of Italian-speaking Sardinian teachers. In 1763, it had already been planned to “send a number of skilled Italian professors" to Sardinia to "rid the Sardinian teachers of their errors" and "steer them along the right path". The purpose did not elude the attention of the Sardinian ruling class, who deplored the fact that "the Piedmontese bishops have introduced preaching in Italian" and, in an anonymous document attributed to the conservative Sardinian Parliament and eloquently called  ("Grievance of the Kingdom"), denounced how "the arms, the privileges, the laws, the language, University, and currency of Aragon have now been taken away, to the disgrace of Spain, and to the detriment of all particulars".

Spanish was replaced as the official language, even though Italian struggled to take roots for a long time: Milà i Fontanals wrote in 1863 that Catalan had been used in notarial instruments from Sardinia well into the 1780s, while parish registers and official deeds continued to be drawn up in Spanish until 1828. The most immediate effect of the order was thus the further marginalization of the Sardinians' native idiom, making way for a thorough Italianisation of the island. Girolamo Sotgiu asserts on the matter that "the Sardinian ruling class, just as it had become Hispanicized, now became Italianised, without ever managing to become Sardinian, that is to say, to draw from the experience and culture of their people, from which it came, those elements of concreteness without which a culture and a ruling class always seem foreign even in their homeland. This was the objective that the Savoyard government had set itself and which, to a good measure, it managed to pursue".

The former two because of the past and today's domination, and they are understood and spoken through schooling by all the educated people residing in the cities, as well as villages. Sardinian is common to all the Kingdom, and is divided into two main dialects, Campidanese Sardinian and Sardinian from the Upper Half (""). Algherese is a Catalan dialect, for a Catalan colony is Alghero; and finally Sassarese, which is spoken in Sassari, Tempio and Castel sardo (sic), is a dialect of Tuscan, a relic of their Pisan overlords. Spanish is losing ground to Italian, which has taken over the former in the fields of education and jurisdiction".

The intention that motivated Madau was to trace the ideal path through which Sardinian could be elevated to the island's proper national language; nevertheless, according to Amos Cardia, the Savoyard climate of repression on Sardinian culture would induce Matteo Madau to veil its radical proposals with some literary devices, and the author was eventually unable to ever translate them into reality. After he moved to Cagliari, he became fascinated with the Sardinian language as well and conducted some research on three specific dialects; the aim of his work, entitled , was to "write down the rules of the Sardinian language" and spur the Sardinians to "cherish the language of their Homeland, as well as Italian". The government in Turin, which had been monitoring Febres' activity, decided that his work would not be allowed to be published: Victor Amadeus III had supposedly not appreciated the fact that the book had a bilingual dedication to him in Italian and Sardinian, a mistake that his successors, while still echoing back to a general concept of "Sardinian ancestral homeland", would from then on avoid, and making exclusive use of Italian to produce their works.

At the end of the 18th century, following the trail of the French Revolution, a group of the Sardinian middle class planned to break away from Savoyard rule and institute an independent Sardinian Republic under French protection; all over the island, a number of political pamphlets printed in Sardinian were illegally distributed, calling for a mass revolt against the "Piedmontese" rule and the barons' abuse. The most famous literary product born out of such political unrest was the poem , noted as a testament of the French-inspired democratic and patriotic values, as well as Sardinia's situation under feudalism. As for the reactions that the three-year Sardinian revolutionary period aroused in the island's ruling class, who were now in the process of Italianisation, for Sotgiu "its failure was complete: undecided between a breathless municipalism and a dead-end attachment to the Crown, it did not have the courage to lead the revolutionary wave coming from the countryside”. In fact, although pamphlets such as "the Achilles of Sardinian Liberation" circulated, denouncing the backwardness of an oppressive feudal system and a Ministry that was said to have “always been the enemy of the Sardinian Nation”, and the “social pact between the Sovereign and the Nation” was declared to have been broken, there was no radical change in the form of government: therefore, it is not surprising, according to Sotgiu, that although “the call for the Sardinian nation, its traditions and identity became stronger and stronger, even to the point of requesting the creation of a stable military force of "Sardinian nationals only"”, the concrete hypothesis of abolishing the monarchical and feudal regimes did not “make its way into the consciousness of many”. The only result was therefore “the defeat of the peasant class emerging from the very  core of feudal society, urged on by the masses of peasants and led by the most advanced forces of the Sardinian bourgeoisie" and, conversely, the victory of the feudal barons and "of large strata of the town bourgeoisie that had developed within the framework of the feudal order and feared that the abolition of feudalism and the proclamation of the Republic might simultaneously destroy the very basis of their own wealth and prestige".

In the climate of monarchic restoration that followed Giovanni Maria Angioy's rebellion, whose substantial failure marked therefrom a historic watershed in Sardinia's future, other Sardinian intellectuals, all characterized by an attitude of general devotion to their island as well as proven loyalty to the House of Savoy, posed in fact the question of the Sardinian language, while being careful enough to use only Italian as a language to get their point across. During the 19th century in particular, the Sardinian intellectuality and ruling class found itself divided over the adherence to the Sardinian national values and the allegiance to the new Italian nationality, toward which they eventually leaned in the wake of the abortive Sardinian revolution. The identity crisis of the Sardinian ruling class, and their strive for acceptance into the new citizenship of the Italian identity, would manifest itself with the publication of the so-called  by the unionist Pietro Martini in 1863.

A few years after the major anti-Piedmontese revolt, in 1811, the priest Vincenzo Raimondo Porru published a timid essay of Sardinian grammar, which, however, referred expressively to the Southern dialect (hence the title of ) and, out of prudence towards the king, was made with the declared intention of easing the acquisition of Italian among his fellow Sardinians, instead of protecting their language. The more ambitious work of the professor and senator Giovanni Spano, the Ortographia sarda nationale ("Sardinian National Orthography"), although it was officially meant for the same purpose as Porru's, attempted in reality to establish a unified Sardinian orthography based on Logudorese, just like Florentine had become the basis for Italian.

The jurist Carlo Baudi di Vesme claimed that the suppression of Sardinian and the imposition of Italian was desirable to make the islanders into "civilized Italians". Since Sardinia was, in the words of Di Vesme, "not Spanish, but neither Italian: it is and has been for centuries just Sardinian”, it was necessary, at the turn of the circumstances that “inflamed it with ambition, desire and love of all things Italian”, to promote these tendencies even more in order “to profit from them in the common interest”, for which it proved “almost necessary” to spread the Italian language in Sardinia “presently so little known in the interior” with a view to better enable the Perfect Fusion: “Sardinia will be Piedmont, it will be Italy; it will receive and give us lustre, wealth and power!".

The primary and tertiary education was thus offered exclusively through Italian, and Piedmontese cartographers went on to replace many Sardinian place names with Italian ones. The Italian education, being imparted in a language the Sardinians were not familiar with, spread Italian for the first time in history to Sardinian villages, marking the troubled transition to the new dominant language; the school environment, which employed Italian as the sole means of communication, grew to become a microcosm around the then-monolingual Sardinian villages. In 1811, the canon Salvatore Carboni published in Bologna the polemic book  ("Holy Discourses in Sardinian language"), wherein the author lamented the fact that Sardinia, “" ("Being an Italian province nowadays, [Sardinia] cannot have laws and public acts made in its own language"), and while claiming that "" ("the Sardinian language, however unofficial, will last as long as Sardinia among the Sardinians"), he also asked himself "" ("Why should we show neglect and contempt for Sardinian, which is a language as ancient and noble as Italian, French and Spanish?").

In 1827, the historical legal code serving as the consuetud de la nació sardesca in the days of the Iberian rule, the Carta de Logu, was abolished and replaced by the more advanced Savoyard code of Charles Felix "Leggi civili e criminali del Regno di Sardegna", written in Italian. The Perfect Fusion with the Mainland States, enacted under the auspices of a "transplant, without any reserves and obstacles, [of] the culture and civilization of the Italian Mainland to Sardinia", would result in the loss of the island's residual autonomy and marked the moment when "the language of the "Sardinian nation" lost its value as an instrument with which to ethnically identify a particular people and its culture, to be codified and cherished, and became instead one of the many regional dialects subordinated to the national language".

Despite the long-term assimilation policy, the anthem of the Savoyard Kingdom of Sardinia would be S'hymnu sardu nationale ("the Sardinian National Anthem"), also known as Cunservet Deus su Re ("God save the King"), before it was de facto replaced by the Italian Marcia Reale as well, in 1861. However, even when the island became part of the Kingdom of Italy under Victor Emmanuel II in 1861, Sardinia's distinct culture from the now unified Mainland made it an overall neglected province within the newly proclaimed unitary nation state. Between 1848 and 1861, the island was plunged into a social and economic crisis that was to last until the post-war period. Eventually, Sardinian came to be perceived as  / , literally translating into English as "the language of hunger" (i.e. the language of the poor), and Sardinian parents strongly supported the teaching of the Italian tongue to their children, since they saw it as the portal to escaping from a poverty-stricken, rural, isolated and underprivileged life.

Late modern period

At the dawn of the 20th century, Sardinian had remained an object of research almost only among the island's scholars, struggling to garner international interest and even more suffering from a certain marginalization in the strictly Italian sphere: one observes in fact “the prevalence of foreign scholars over Italian ones and/or the existence of fundamental and still irreplaceable contributions by non-Italian linguists”. The pioneering research of German authors spurred a certain interest in the Sardinian language on the part of some Italian scholars, such as Graziadio Isaia Ascoli and, above all, his disciple Pier Enea Guarnerio, who was the first in Italy to classify Sardinian as a separate member of the Romance language family without subordinating it to the group of "Italian dialects", as was previously the custom in Italy. Hist. Kl., 145), the study of which led to the initiation into Sardinian linguistics of the then university student Max Leopold Wagner: it is to the latter's activity that much of the twentieth-century knowledge and research of Sardinian in the phonetic, morphological and, in part, syntactic fields was generated.

During the mobilization for World War I, the Italian Army compelled all people on the island that were "of Sardinian stock" to enlist as Italian subjects and established the Sassari Infantry Brigade on 1 March 1915 at Tempio Pausania and Sinnai. Unlike the other infantry brigades of Italy, Sassari's conscripts were only Sardinians (including many officers). It is currently the only unit in Italy with an anthem in a language other than Italian: Dimonios ("Devils"), which would be written in 1994 by Luciano Sechi; its title derives from the German-language Rote Teufel ("red devils"), by which they were popularly known among the troops of the Austro-Hungarian Army. Compulsory military service around this period played a role in language shift and is referred to by historian Manlio Brigaglia as "the first great mass "nationalization"" of the Sardinians. Nevertheless, similarly to Navajo-speaking service members in the United States during World War II, as well as Quechua speakers during the Falklands War, native Sardinians were offered the opportunity to be recruited as code talkers to transmit tactical information in Sardinian over radio communications which might have otherwise run the risk of being gained by Austrian troops, since some of them hailed from Italian-speaking areas to which, therefore, the Sardinian language was utterly alien: Alfredo Graziani writes in his war diary that "having learned that many of our phonograms were being intercepted, we adopted the system of communicating on the phone only in Sardinian, certain that in this way they would never be able to understand what one was saying". To avoid infiltration attempts by said Italophone troops, positions were guarded by Sardinian recruits from the Sassari Brigade who required anyone who came to them that they identify themselves first by proving they spoke Sardinian: “".

The Sardinian-born philosopher Antonio Gramsci commented on the Sardinian linguistic question while writing a letter to his sister Teresina; Gramsci was aware of the long-term ramifications of language shift, and suggested that Teresa let her son acquire Sardinian with no restriction, because doing otherwise would result in "putting his imagination into a straitjacket" as well as him ending up eventually "learning two jargons, and no language at all".

Coinciding with the year of the Irish War of Independence, Sardinian autonomism re-emerged as an expression of the fighters' movement, coagulating into the Sardinian Action Party (PsdAz) which, before long, would become one of the most important players in the island's political life. At the beginning, the party would not have had strictly ethnic claims though, being the Sardinian language and culture widely perceived, in the words of Fiorenzo Toso, as "symbols of the region's underdevelopment".

The policy of forced assimilation culminated in the twenty years of the Fascist regime, which launched a campaign of violent compression of autonomist demands and finally determined the island's definitive entry into the "national cultural system" through the combined work of the educational system and the one-party system. Local cultural expressions were thus repressed, including Sardinia's festivals and improvised poetry competitions, and a large number of Sardinian surnames were changed to sound more Italian. An argument broke out between the Sardinian poet Antioco Casula (popularly known as Montanaru) and the fascist journalist Gino Anchisi, who stated that “once the region is moribund or dead", which the regime declared to be, "so will the dialect (sic)", which was interpreted as "the region's revealing spiritual element"; in the wake of this debate, Anchisi managed to have Sardinian banned from the printing press, as well. The significance of the Sardinian language as it was posed by Casula, in fact, lent itself to potentially subversive themes, being tied to the practices of cultural resistance of an indigenous ethnic group, whose linguistic repertoire had to be introduced in school to preserve a "Sardinian personality" and regain "a dignity" perceived to have been lost in the process. Another famed poet from the island, Salvatore (Bore) Poddighe, fell into a severe depression and took his own life a few years after his masterwork (Sa Mundana Cummedia) had been seized by Cagliari's police commissioner. When the use of Sardinian in school was banned in 1934 as part of a nation-wide educational plan against the alloglot "dialects", the then Sardinian-speaking children were confronted with another means of communication that was supposed to be their own from then onwards.

On a whole, this period saw the most aggressive cultural assimilation effort by the central government, which led to an even further sociolinguistic degradation of Sardinian. While the interior managed to at least partially resist this intrusion at first, everywhere else the regime had succeeded in thoroughly supplanting the local cultural models with new ones hitherto foreign to the community and compress the former into a "pure matter of folklore", marking a severance from the island's heritage that engendered, according to Guido Melis, "an identity crisis with worrying social repercussions", as well as "a rift that could no longer be healed through the generations". This period is identified by Manlio Brigaglia as the second mass "nationalization" of the Sardinians, which was characterized by “a policy deliberately aiming at "Italianisation"" by means of, in his words, "a declared war" against the usage of the Sardinian language by fascism and the Catholic Church alike.

In 1945, following the restoration of political freedoms, the Sardinian Action Party called for autonomy as a federal state within the "new Italy" that had emerged from the Resistance: it was in the context of the second post-war period that, as consensus for autonomy kept growing, the party began to distinguish itself by policies based on Sardinia's linguistic and cultural specificity.

Present situation

After World War II, awareness around the Sardinian language and the danger of its slipping away did not seem to concern the Sardinian elites and entered the political spaces later than in other European peripheries marked by the presence of local ethno-linguistic minorities; Sardinian was in fact dismissed by the middle class, as both the Sardinian language and culture were still being held responsible for the island's underdevelopment. The Sardinian ruling class, drawn to the Italian modernisation stance on how to steer the islanders to "social development", believed in fact that the Sardinians had been held back by their own "traditional practices" vis-à-vis the mainlanders, and that, in order to catch up with the latter, social and cultural progress could only be brought about through the rejection of said practices. As the language bore an increasing amount of stigmatisation and came to be perceived as an undesirable identity marker, the Sardinians were consequently encouraged to part with it by way of linguistic and cultural assimilation.

At the time of drafting of the statute in 1948, the national legislator in Rome eventually decided to specify the "Sardinian specialty" as a criterion for political autonomy uniquely on the grounds of local socio-economic issues; further considerations were discarded which were centred on the ascertainment of a distinct cultural, historical and geographical identity, although they had been hitherto the primary local justifications arguing for home rule, as they were looked down upon as a potential prelude to more autonomist or even more radical separatist claims; this view would be exemplified by a report of the Italian Parliamentary Commission of Inquiry into Banditry, which warned against a looming threat posed by "isolationist tendencies injurious to the development of Sardinian society and recently manifesting themselves in the proposal to regard Sardinian as the language of an ethnic minority". Eventually, the special statute of 1948 settled instead to concentrate on the arrangement of state-funded plans (baptised with the Italian name of ) for the heavy industrial development of the island. 

Therefore, far from generating a Statute grounded on the acknowledgment of a particular cultural identity like, for example, in the Aosta Valley and South Tyrol, what ended up resulting in Sardinia was, in the words of Mariarosa Cardia, an outcome "solely based on economic considerations, because there was not either the will or the ability to devise a strong and culturally motivated autonomy, a "Sardinian specificity" that was not defined in terms of social backwardness and economic deprivation". Emilio Lussu, who admitted that he had only voted in favour of the final draft "to prevent the Statute from being rejected altogether by a single vote, even in such a reduced form", was the only member, at the session of 30 December 1946, to call in vain for the mandatory teaching of the Sardinian language, arguing that it was "a millenary heritage that must be preserved".

The Ministry of Public Education once requested that the teachers willing to teach Sardinian be put under surveillance. The rejection of the indigenous language and culture, along with a rigid model of Italian-language education which induced a denigration of Sardinian through corporal punishment and shaming, has led to poor schooling for the Sardinians. Roberto Bolognesi stated that in his school years in Sardinia, he had "witnessed both physical and psychological abuse against monolingual Sardinian-speaking children. The psychological violence consisted usually in calling the children "donkeys" and in inviting the whole class to join the mockery". Early school leaving and high school failure rates in Sardinia prompted a debate in the early Nineties on the efficaciousness of strictly monolingual education, with proposals for a focus on a comparative approach.

Claims for an autonomous solution to the Sardinian economic, social and cultural problems, which the 1948 Statute proved unable to resolve, came to the fore once again in the Sixties, with campaigns, often expressed in the form of political demands by Sardinian nationalists, to give Sardinian equal status with Italian as a means to promote cultural identity. Antonio Simon Mossa had drawn from his past experiences across the world, including the newly independent country of Algeria, that Sardinians were one of the many ethnic and national minorities facing the danger of cultural assimilation, and his fervor reverberated across the Sardinian society, pushing even some non-nationalist groups to take an interest in matters relating to minorities. Although a law was passed as early as 1955 for the establishment of five professorships of Sardinian linguistics, one of the first demands for bilingualism was in fact formulated in a resolution adopted by the University of Cagliari in 1971, calling upon the national and regional authorities to recognize the Sardinians as an ethnic and linguistic minority and Sardinian as the islanders' co-official language. At a time when the Italian "modernisation plans" in Sardinia were in full swing, the Italian government was apprehensive about this deliberation by the University of Cagliari as providing the timber for further ethnic unrest in the state's peripheries. Sergio Salvi's description of the Sardinians as a "forbidden nation" in Italy further contributed to the linguistic question gaining more notoriety at the national level. A first legal draft concerning Sardinian as a language to be legally put on an equal position with Italian was developed by the Sardinian Action Party in 1975. Critical acclaim in Sardinian cultural circles followed the patriotic poem No sias isciau ("Don't be a slave") by Raimondo Piras some months before his death in 1977, urging bilingual education to reverse the ongoing trend of cultural De-Sardization.

Indeed, during the late 70s reports were released that Sardinian was on course of being abandoned in favour of Italian in the towns and among the younger generation. By then, a significant shift to Italian had been noted in rural Sardinia not only in the Campidanese plain, but even in some inner areas that had been previously considered Sardinian-speaking bastions, manifesting a parallel shift of the values upon which the ethnic and cultural identity of the Sardinians was traditionally grounded. From then onwards, the use of Sardinian would continue to recede because of the strongly negative view the Sardinian community developed toward it, assuming a self-belittling attitude which has been described as the emergence of a "minority complex" fairly typical of linguistic minorities. However, by the Eighties the language had become a point of ethnic pride: it also became a tool through which long held grievances towards the central government's failure at delivering better economic and social conditions could be channeled. A contradicting tendency has been noted by observing that, while Sardinian is held in a much more positive light than before, its actual use has notably decreased and keeps doing so.

A law by popular initiative for Sardinian-Italian bilingualism garnered considerable success as it kept gathering thousands of signatures, but was promptly blocked by the Italian Communist Party and thus never implemented. The same Italian Communist Party would later propose, however, another bill of its own initiative "for the protection of the language and culture of the Sardinian people" in 1980. In the end, following tensions and claims of the Sardinian nationalist movement for concrete cultural and political autonomy, including the recognition of the Sardinians as an ethnic and linguistic minority, three separate bills were eventually presented to the Regional Council in the Eighties. In 1981, the Regional Council debated and voted for the introduction of bilingualism in Sardinia for the first time. As pressure by a resolution of the Council of Europe continued to bear on Italian policy-makers for the protection of minorities, a Commission was appointed in 1982 to investigate the issue; the following year, a bill was presented to the Italian Parliament, but without success. One of the first laws approved by the Sardinian legislator with respect to the protection and promotion of the Sardinian language and culture was soon rejected by the Constitutional Court in 1994, which deemed it "exorbitant in a multitude of ways with regard to the supplementary and implementing powers enjoyed by the Region in matters of education"; it was not until 1997 that Sardinian was finally recognized by the regional law (n. 26 of 15 October 1997 "Promotion and enhancement of the culture and language of Sardinia") without there being any recourse from the Italian central government; this law too, however, would prove to be more focused on the traditions and history of the Sardinian people than their language in itself.

A survey conducted by MAKNO in 1984 showed that three-quarters of the Sardinians had a positive attitude towards bilingual education (22% of the interviewees, especially in the Province of Nuoro and Oristano, wanted Sardinian to be compulsory in Sardinian schools, while 54.7% would prefer to see teaching in Sardinian as optional) and official bilingualism like in the Aosta Valley and South Tyrol (62.7% of the population were in favour, 25.9% said no and 11.4% were unsure). Such consensus remains relatively stable to this day; another survey, conducted in 2008, reported that more than half of the interviewees, 57.3%, were in favour of the introduction of Sardinian into schools alongside Italian. More research carried out in 2010 confirmed warm reception among the students' parents to introducing Sardinian at school, even though skepticism circulated around having it taught as the vehicular language of education.

In the 1990s, there had been a resurgence of Sardinian-language music, ranging from the more traditional genres (etc.) to rock (etc.) and even hip hop and rap (Dr. Drer e CRC Posse, Quilo, Malam, Menhir, Stranos Elementos, Malos Cantores, Randagiu Sardu, Futta etc.), and with artists who used the language as a means to promote the island and address its long-standing issues and the new challenges. A few films (like Su Re, Bellas Mariposas, Treulababbu, Sonetaula etc.) have also been dubbed in Sardinian, and some others were provided with subtitles in the language. The first scientific work in Sardinian, delving into the question of modern energy supplies, was written by Paolo Giuseppe Mura, Physics Professor at the University of Cagliari, in 1995.

Eventually, sustained activism made possible the ratification by Italy of the European Framework Convention for the Protection of National Minorities in 1998, which would be followed in 1999 by the formal recognition of twelve minority languages (Sardinian, Albanian, Catalan, German, Greek, Slovenian, Croatian, French, Franco-Provençal, Friulian, Ladin and Occitan) through the framework law no. 482, in keeping with the spirit of Art. 6 of the Italian Constitution ("The Republic safeguards linguistic minorities by means of appropriate measures"). While the first section of said law states that Italian is the official language of the Republic, a number of provisions are included to normalize the use of such languages and let them become part of the national fabric. However, Italy (along with France and Malta) has never ratified the European Charter for Regional or Minority Languages. Nevertheless, the law proved to be a positive step towards the legalization of Sardinian as it put at least an end to the ban on the language which had been in effect since the Italian Unification, and was deemed as a starting point, albeit timid, to pursue a more decentralized school curriculum for the island.

Still, some national school books (education has never fallen under the region's remits and is managed by the state at the central level) have not stopped to squeeze the language into the Italian acceptation of dialetto ("Italian dialect") in spite of its actual recognition by the state. Sardinian is yet to be taught at school, with the exception of a few experimental occasions; Mauro Maxia noticed a lack of interest on the part of school managers, some request for Sardinian language classes notwithstanding. Furthermore, its use has not ceased to be disincentivized as antiquated or even indicative of a lack of education, leading many locals to associate it with negative feelings of shame, backwardness, and provincialism. Similar issues of identity have been observed in regard to the community's attitude toward what they positively perceive to be part of "modernity", generally associated with the Italian cultural sphere, as opposed to the Sardinian one, whose aspects have long been stigmatized as "primitive" and "barbarous" by the political and social institutions that ruled the island. Roberto Bolognesi believes that the enduring stigmatisation of Sardinian as the language of the "socially and culturally disadvantaged" classes leads to the nurturing of a vicious circle that further promotes the language's regression, reinforcing its negative judgement among those who perceive themselves as "most competitive": "a perverse mechanism that has condemned and still condemns Sardinian speakers to social marginalisation, systematically excluding them from those linguistic and cultural interactions in which the prestigious registers and high style of language are developed, first and foremost in schools".

A number of other factors like a considerable immigration flow from mainland Italy, the interior rural exodus to urban areas, where Sardinian is spoken by a much lower percentage of the population, and the use of Italian as a prerequisite for jobs and social advancement actually hinder any policy set up to promote the language. Therefore, following the model proposed by a UNESCO panel of experts in 2003, Sardinian is classified by UNESCO as a "definitely endangered" language ("children no longer learn the language as mother tongue in the home"), on the way to become "severely endangered" ("the language is used mostly by the grandparental generation and up").

Language use is far from stable; following the Expanded GIDS (Expanded Graded Intergenerational Disruption Scale) model, Sardinian would position between 7 ("Shifting: the child-bearing generation knows the language well enough to use it among themselves but none are transmitting it to their children") and 8a ("Moribund: the only remaining active speakers of the language are members of the grandparent generation"). While an estimated 68 percent of the islanders had in fact a good oral command of Sardinian, language ability among the children has plummeted to less than 13 percent; some linguists, like Mauro Maxia, cite the low number of Sardinian-speaking children (with the notable case of a number of villages where Sardinian has ceased to be spoken altogether since 1993) as indicative of language decline, calling Sardinia a case of "linguistic suicide". The depth of the Sardophone networks' increasing assimilation into Italian is illustrated by the latest ISTAT data published in 2017, which confirm Italian as the language that has largely taken root as the means of socialization within Sardinian families (52.1%), relegating the practice of code-switching to 31.5% and the actual use of languages other than Italian to only 15.6%; outside the social circle of family and friends, the numbers define Italian as by far the most prevalent language (87.2%), as opposed to the usage of Sardinian and other languages which has dropped to 2.8%. Today, most people who use Sardinian as part of day-to-day life reside mainly in the sparsely populated areas in the countryside, like the mountainous region of Barbagia.

A bill proposed by the cabinet of the former Italian Prime Minister Mario Monti would have further lowered the protection level of Sardinian, distinguishing between the so-called "national minorities", speaking languages protected by international agreements (German, Slovenian, French) and the "linguistic minorities" whose language is not spoken in any state other than Italy (all the other ethno-linguistic groups, including Sardinian). This bill, which was eventually implemented but later deemed unconstitutional by the Court, triggered a reaction on the island. Students expressed an interest in taking all (or part) of their exit examinations in Sardinian. In response to a 2013 Italian initiative to remove bilingual signs on the island, a group of Sardinians began a virtual campaign on Google Maps to replace Italian place names with the original Sardinian names. After about one month, Google changed the place names back to Italian.

After a signature campaign, it has been made possible to change the language setting on Facebook from any language to Sardinian. It is also possible to switch to Sardinian even in Telegram and a number of other programs, like F-Droid, Diaspora, OsmAnd, Notepad++, QGIS, Swiftkey, Stellarium, Skype, VLC media player for Android and iOS, Linux Mint Debian Edition 2 "Betsy", etc. The DuckDuckGo search engine is available in Sardinian as well. In 2016, the first automatic translation software from Italian to Sardinian was developed.

In 2015, all the political parties in the Sardinian regional council reached an agreement concerning a series of amendments to the old 1997 law to be able to introduce the optional teaching of the language in Sardinia's schools. The Unified Text on the Discipline of the Regional linguistic policy was eventually approved on 27 June 2018, with the aim of setting in motion a path towards bilingual administration, contributions to bilingual mass media, publishing, IT schools and websites; it also allowed for the foundation of a Sardinian board (Consulta de su Sardu) with thirty experts that would propose a linguistic standard based on the main historical varieties, and would also have advisory duties towards the Regional body. However, said law has yet to be followed up by the respective implementing decrees, the lack of which prevents it from being legally applicable. Some Sardinian language activists and activist groups have also contested the law itself, considering it a political attack on Sardinian made to try to negate its uniformity and to relegate it to folklore, and also noted how its text contains a few parts that could bring the Italian government to challenge it.

In 2021 the Prosecutor of Oristano opened a Sardinian linguistic desk, both to support citizens and to provide advice and translations to magistrates and the police. It has been the first time in Italy in which such a service has been offered to a minority language.

Although there is still not an option to teach Sardinian on the island itself, let alone in Italy, some language courses are instead sometimes available in Germany (Universities of Stuttgart, Munich, Tübingen, Mannheim etc.), Spain (University of Girona), Iceland and Czech Republic (Brno university). Shigeaki Sugeta also taught Sardinian to his students of Romance languages at the Waseda University in Tokyo (Japan), and would even release a Sardinian-Japanese dictionary out of it.

At present, the Sardinian-speaking community is the least protected one in Italy, despite being the largest minority language group officially recognized by the state. In fact the language, which is receding in all domains of use, is still not given access to any field of public life, such as education (Italian–Sardinian bilingualism is still frowned upon, while the local public universities play little, if any, role whatsoever in supporting the language), politics (with the exception of some nationalist groups), justice, administrative authorities and public services, media, and cultural, ecclesiastical, economic and social activities, as well as facilities. In a case presented to the European Commission by the then MEP Renato Soru in 2017, in which he complained of national negligence with regard to the state's own legislation in comparison to other linguistic minorities, the Commission's response pointed out to the Honourable Member that matters of language policy pursued by individual member states do not fall within its competences.

According to a 2017 report on the digital language diversity in Europe, Sardinian appears to be particularly vital on social media as part of many people's everyday life for private use, but such vitality does not still translate into a strong and wide availability of Internet media for the language. In 2017, a 60-hour Sardinian language course was introduced for the first time in Sardinia and Italy at the University of Cagliari, although such a course had been already available in other universities abroad.

In 2015, the Council of Europe commented on the status of national minorities in Italy, noting the approach of the Italian government towards them with the exception of the German, French and Slovenian languages, where Italy has applied full bilingualism due to international agreements; despite the formal recognition from the Italian state, Italy does not in fact collect any information on the ethnic and linguistic composition of the population, apart from South Tyrol. There is also virtually no print and broadcasting media exposure in politically or numerically weaker minorites like Sardinian. Moreover, the resources allocated to cultural projects like bilingual education, which lacks a consistent approach and offers no guarantee of continuity throughout the years, are largely insufficient to meet "even the most basic expectations".

A solution to the Sardinian question being unlikely to be found anytime soon, the language has become highly endangered: even though the endogamy rate among group members seems to be very high, less than 15 per cent of the Sardinian children use the language to communicate with each other. it appears that the late recognition of Sardinian as a minority language on the part of the state, as well as the gradual but pervasive Italianisation promoted by the latter's education system, the administration system and the media, followed by the intergenerational language replacement, made it so that the vitality of Sardinian has been heavily compromised. The 1995 Euromosaic project, which conducted a research study on the current situation of the ethno-linguitic minorities across Europe under the auspices of the European Commission, concludes their report on Sardinian as follows:

As Matteo Valdes explains, "the island's population sees, day after day, the decline of their original languages. They are complicit in this decline, passing on to their children the language of prestige and power, but at the same time they feel that the loss of local languages is also a loss of themselves, of their history, of their own specific identity or distinctiveness".

Roberto Bolognesi argues that, in the face of the persistent denial and rejection of the Sardinian language, it is as if the latter "had taken revenge" on its original community of speakers "and continues to do so by "polluting" the hegemonic linguistic system", recalling Gramsci's prophetic warning uttered at the dawn of the previous century. In fact, compared to a now prevalent regional Italian that, according to Bolognesi, "is in fact a hybrid language that has arisen from the contact between two different linguistic systems", "the (little) Sardinian which is used by young people often constitutes an ungrammatical jargon filled with obscenities and constructions belonging to Italian": in other words, the population would therefore only master "two crippled languages" whose manifestations do not arise from a recognisable norm, nor do they constitute a clear source of linguistic security. Bolognesi believes therefore that the Sardinians' utter "rejection of their original linguistic identity has not entailed the hoped-for and automatic homologation to a more socially prestigious identity, but the acquisition of a second-class identity (neither truly Sardinian nor truly Italian), no longer self-centred but rather peripheral with respect to the sources of linguistic and cultural norms, which still remain beyond their reach: on the other side of the Tyrrhenian Sea”.

By contrast, Eduardo Blasco Ferrer has been noted how the Sardinian-speaking community engages only in code-switching and usually takes care in refraining from code-mixing between the two different languages.

Negative attitudes among native speakers have been observed towards second-language learners for speaking "poor Sardinian", an attitude considered to be ethnically grounded on the interaction of in-group and out-group dynamics.

In conclusion, the Sardinian language, while still being described as "viable" in 2003, continues to be adversely affected by pervasive and all-encompassing Italianisation through language shift, and is thus nowadays moribund, albeit its replacement continues at a slower pace than before thanks to the commitment of those who, in various contexts, promote its revaluation in a process that has been defined by some scholars as "linguistic re-Sardization". Still, arrangements for bilingualism exist only on paper and factors such as the intergenerational transmission, which remain essential in the reproduction of the ethnolinguistic group, are severely compromised because of Italianisation; many young speakers, who have been raised in Italian rather than Sardinian, have a command of their ethnic language which does not extend beyond a few stereotyped formulas, and even today's cohort of older Sardinian speakers is unable to carry on an entire conversation in Sardinian as their knowledge of it gets increasingly fragmented. As of now, Sardinian seems to be viewed by the islanders as an instrument for the reappropriation of their past, rather than for its use as a means of communication for the present and future.

Phonology

† Variable presence, depending on dialect.

‡ Mainly in Nuorese.

† Only in Campidanese.

Grammar
Some distinctive features typical of Sardinian include:

Nouns
 The plural marker is -s (from the Latin accusative plural), as in Western Romance languages like French, Occitan, Catalan, Spanish, Portuguese and Galician: sardu, sardus "Sardinian"; pudda, puddas "hen"; margiane, margianes "fox". In Italo-Dalmatian languages like Italian, or Eastern Romance languages like Romanian, the plural ends with -i, -e or -a.
 The definite article derives from the Latin ipse: su, sa, plural sos, sas (Logudorese) and is (Campidanese). At present, such articles are only common in Balearic Catalan and were once used in Gascon as well, whilst all the other Romance languages make use of forms derived from ille.

Verbs

Sardinian verbs are divided into three main classes, each distinguished by a different infinitive ending (-are, -ere, or -ire). The conjugations of regular verbs in the standard language are as follows:

Syntax
Distinctive syntax features include:
 A common occurrence of a left-dislocated construction: cussa cantone apo cantadu ("That song I have sung": that is, "I've sung that song").
 In yes/no questions, fronting of a constituent (especially a predicative element) is required, though it is not specifically a question-formation process: Cumprendiu m'as? ("Understood me you have", that is, "Have you understood me?"), Mandicatu at? ("Eaten he/she has", that is "Has he/she eaten?"), Fattu l'at ("Done he/she has", that is "He/She's done it"), etc.
Interrogative phrases might be constructed like echo questions, with the interrogative marker remaining in underlying position: Sunt lòmpios cando? ("They arrived when?", that is, "when did they arrive?"), Juanne at pigadu olìas cun chie? ("John has picked olives with whom?"), etc.
 Impersonal sentence constructions are commonly used to replace the passive voice, which is limited to the formal register: A Juanni ddu ant mortu rather than Juanni est istadu mortu.
 The use of non de + noun: non de abba, abbardente est ("not of water brandy it+is": that is, "It is not water, but brandy."); non de frades, parent inimigos ("Not of brothers, they seem enemies": that is, "Far from being brothers, they are like enemies").
 The use of ca (from quia) or chi as subordinate conjunctions: Ja nau ti l'apo ca est issa sa mere ("Already told I have you that is she the boss", that is "I've already told you that it's her the boss").
 Existential uses of àer / ài ("to have") and èsser / èssi ("to be"): B'at prus de chentu persones inoghe! ("There is over a hundred people in here!"), Nci funt is pratus in mesa ("There are the plates on the table").
 Ite ("What") + adjective + chi: Ite bellu chi ses! ("What beautiful that (you) are!", that is "How beautiful you are!").
 Nominal syntagmas without having a head: Cussu ditzionariu de gregu est prus mannu de su de Efis ("That Greek dictionary is bigger than Efisio's"), Cudda machina est prus manna de sa de Juanne ("That car is bigger than John's").
 Extraposition of the lexical head: Imprestami su tou de ditzionariu ("Please lend me your dictionary").
 Ancu + subjunctive as a way to express a (malevolent) wish on someone: Ancu ti falet unu lampu! ("May you be struck by lightning!").
 Prepositional accusative: Apo bidu a Maria ("I've seen Mary").
 Insertion of the affirmative particle ja / giai: Ja m'apo corcau ("I did go to bed").
 Use of the same particle to express antiphrastic formulas: Jai ses totu istudiatu, tue! ("You're so well educated!", that is, "You are so ignorant and full of yourself!").
 Reflexive use of intransitive verbs: Tziu Pascale si nch'est mortu eris sero ("Uncle Pascal passed away yesterday"), Mi nch'apo dormiu pro una parica de oras ("I've slept for a couple of hours").
 Use of àer in reflexive sentences: Si at fertu a s'anca traballende ("He/She injured himself/herself while working").
 Combination of the perfective and progressive verb aspect: Est istadu traballende totu sa die ("He/She has been working all day").
 Continuous and progressive aspect of the verb, which is meant to indicate an effective situation rather than typical or habitual: Non ti so cumprendende ("I don't understand you").
 Relative lack of adverbs: with the exception of some localized words like the Nuorese mescamente ("especially"), as well as some recent loanwords from Italian, all the Sardinian dialects have a number of ways with which to express the meaning conferred to the adverbs by the other Romance languages (e.g. Luchía currit prus a lestru / acoitendi de María, "Lucy runs faster than Mary").
 The expression of the deontic modality through a periphrastic form, characterized by the verb "to want" in auxiliary position, a feature also common to Southern Corsican, Sicilian, Moroccan Arabic and Moroccan Berber, in addition to some non-standard varieties of English. (e.g. Su dinare bolet / cheret torradu "money has to be paid back").
 The condaghes seem to demonstrate that unlike other Romance languages, Old Sardinian may have had verb-initial word order, with optional topicalization into the beginning of the sentence. While verb-initial word order is also attested in other old Romance languages, such as Old Venetian, Old French, Old Neapolitan, Old Spanish, Old Sicilian and others, it has been argued that Old Sardinian was alone in licensing verb-initial word order (V1) as the generalized word order, while the others had V1 only as a marked alternative.

Vocabulary comparison with other Romance languages

Varieties

Historically, the Sardinians have always been a small-numbered population scattered across isolated cantons, sharing demographic patterns similar to the neighbouring Corsica; as a result, Sardinian developed a broad spectrum of dialects over the time. Starting from Francesco Cetti's description in the 18th century, Sardinian has been presented as a pluricentric language, being traditionally subdivided into two standardized varieties spoken by roughly half of the entire community: the dialects spoken in North-Central Sardinia, centered on the orthography known as Logudorese (su sardu logudoresu), and the dialects spoken in South-Central Sardinia, centered on another orthography called Campidanese (su sardu campidanesu).

All the Sardinian dialects differ primarily in phonetics, which does not considerably hamper intelligibility; the view of there being a dialectal boundary rigidly separating the two varieties of High Sardinian has been in fact subjected to more recent research, which shows a fluid dialect continuum from the northern to the southern ends of the island. The dualist perception of the Sardinian dialects, rather than pointing to an actual isogloss, is in fact the result of a psychological adherence to the way Sardinia was administratively subvidided into a Caput Logudori (Cabu de Susu) and a Caput Calaris (Cabu de Jossu) by the Spanish.

The dialects centered on the "Logudorese Sardinian model" are generally considered more conservative, with the Nuorese dialect of Sardinian (su sardu nugoresu) being deemed the most conservative of all. They have all retained the classical Latin pronunciation of the stop velars (kena versus cena, "supper"), the front middle vowels (compare Campidanese iotacism, probably from Byzantine Greek) and assimilation of close-mid vowels (cane versus cani, "dog" and gattos versus gattus, "cats"). Labio-velars become plain labials (limba versus lingua, "language" and abba versus acua, "water"). I is prosthesized before consonant clusters beginning in s (iscala versus Campidanese Sardinian scala, "stairway" and iscola versus scola, "school"). An east-west strip of villages in central Sardinia, mainly in the central part of the Province of Oristano, and central part of the Province of Nuoro, speaks a transitional group of dialects (su sardu de mesania). Examples include is limbas (the languages) and is abbas (the waters). The dialects centered on the Campidanese model, spreading from Cagliari (once the metropolis of the Roman province), show relatively more influences from Carthage, Rome, Constantinople and Late Latin. Examples include is fruminis (the rivers) and is domus (the houses).

Some dialects of Sardinian from the extreme ends of the aforementioned continuum have been estimated in another research to have 88% of matches in 110-item wordlist, similarly to the 85–88% number of matches between Provençal Occitan and some Catalan dialects which by some standards is usually (even though arbitrarily) considered characteristic for two different, albeit very closely related, languages. ISO 639 counts four Sardinian languages (Campidanese, Gallurese, Logudorese and Sassarese), each with its own language code.
Non-Sardinian language varieties spoken in Sardinia

Sardinian is the indigenous and historical language of most Sardinian communities. However, Sardinian is not spoken as the native and primary language in a significant number of other ones, roughly amounting to 20% of the Sardinian population; Sassari, the second-largest city on Sardinia and the main center of the northern half of the island, is amongst the latter. The aforementioned Gallurese and Sassarese, despite being often colloquially considered part of Sardinian, are two Corso-Sardinian transitional languages; they are spoken in the northernmost part of Sardinia, although some Sardinian is also understood by the majority of people living therein (73.6% in Gallura and 67.8% in the Sassarese-speaking subregion).

Francesco Cetti, responsible for the dialectal partition of the Sardinian language in his early dissertation, went on to deem these Corso-Sardinian varieties spoken in the island "foreign" (i.e. not indigenous to Sardinia) and therefore "not national" (i.e. non-Sardinian) in that he averred they would be "an Italian dialect, much more Tuscan in fact than the vast majority of Italy's dialects themselves".

There are also two language islands, the Catalan Algherese-speaking community from the inner city of Alghero (northwest Sardinia) and the Ligurian-speaking towns of Carloforte, in San Pietro Island, and Calasetta in Sant'Antioco island (south-west Sardinia).

Sample of text

Standardization

Until 2001, there was not a unifying orthographic standard available for all the dialects of Sardinian, neither in the literary nor in the oral domain (one designed for the latter does not exist to this day).

After the Middle Ages, where a certain orthographic uniformity can be observed, the only steps to provide the language with a single standard, called "illustrious Sardinian", were undertaken by such writers as Hieronimu Araolla, Ioan Mattheu Garipa and Matteo Madau, who had based their works on the model of medieval Sardinian. However, attempts to formalise and spread this orthography would be hindered by the Iberian and later Savoyard authorities.

The dialectally fragmented nature of the language is such that it is popularly contended that Sardinian is divided into two or more groups, which have provided themselves with a series of traditional orthographies already, albeit with many changes over the time. While this belief is not grounded on linguistic considerations, it is however motivated by political and social reasons.

In addition to the orthographies commonly referred to as "Logudorese" and "Campidanese", the Nuorese orthography, the Arborense one and even those restricted to individual towns were also developed, sometimes finding common ground with some general rules, such as those required by the Ozieri Award. It is often the case, however, that speakers who are not commonly taught the Sardinian language and are thus literate only in Italian, for lack of a bilingual education, transcribe their local spelling following rules pertaining to the latter rather than the former.

However, some attempts have been made to introduce a single orthographic form for administrative purposes over the recent decades; said form does not aim to refer to morphology and syntax, which is already fairly homogeneous, but concerns itself primarily with spelling.

To allow for an effective implementation of the provisions on the language, as per the regional law no. 26/1997 and the national law no. 482/1999, the Sardinian Autonomous Region arranged for a commission of experts to elaborate a standard capable of overcoming the hurdle posed by the dialectal differences and thereby providing a unified writing system. A first proposal (the LSU: Limba Sarda Unificada, published on 28 February 2001) was tabled, which identified a model language of reference (based on the analysis of local varieties of Sardinian and on the selection of the most representative and compatible models) so as to guarantee the necessary characteristics of certainty, coherence, univocity, and supra-local diffusion. The people appointed for the task were Eduardo Blasco Ferrer, Roberto Bolognesi, Diego Salvatore Corraine, Ignazio Delogu, Antonietta Dettori, Giulio Paulis, Massimo Pittau, Tonino Rubattu, Leonardo Sole, Heinz Jürgen Wolf, and Matteo Porru acting as the Committee's secretary. This study, although scientifically valid, has never been adopted at an institutional level: critics argued that it was an "artificial" system "imposed" on Sardinian speakers.

Nevertheless, the LSU would act as a springboard for a subsequent drafting proposal, this time drawn by a new Committee composed of Giulio Angioni, Roberto Bolognesi, Manlio Brigaglia, Michel Contini, Diego Corraine, Giovanni Lupinu, Anna Oppo, Giulio Paulis, Maria Teresa Pinna Catte and Mario Puddu. The new project continued to be worked on, going by the name of LSC (Limba Sarda Comuna). The new experimental standard proposal, published in 2006, was characterised by taking the mesania (transitional) varieties as reference, and welcoming elements of the spoken language so as to be perceived as a more "natural" mediation; it also ensured that the common orthography would be provided with the characteristics of over-dialectality and supra-municipality, while being open to integrating the phonetic peculiarities of the local variants. Despite this, there was some criticism for this norm as well, both by those who proposed amendments to improve it, and by those who preferred to insist with the idea of dividing Sardinian into two macro-variants with their own separate orthographies.

The Sardinian Regional Government, with the resolution of the Regional Council n. 16/14 of 18 April 2006 "Limba Sarda Comuna. Adoption of the reference standards of an experimental nature for the written language output of the Regional Administration", has experimentally adopted the LSC as the official orthography for the acts and documents issued by the Region of Sardinia (even if, as per Article 8 of the national Law no. 482/99, only the text written in Italian has legal value), giving citizens the right to write to the Public Administration in their own variety and establishing the regional language desk Ufitziu de sa Limba Sarda. The resolution does not aim to impose the guide and further notes that it is "open to integrations" and that "all solutions are of equal linguistic value".

In the following years, the Region has abided by the LSC standard in the translation of many documents and resolutions and in many other areas. In addition, the LSC standard has been adopted on a voluntary basis by many other institutions, schools and media, often in a complementary manner with orthographic norms closer to the local spelling. Regarding these uses, a percentage estimate was made, considering only the projects financed or co-financed by the Region for the diffusion of the Sardinian language in the municipal and supra-municipal language offices, for the teaching in schools and the media from 2007 to 2013.

The monitoring, by the Sardinian Language and Culture Service of the Department of Public Education, was published on the website of the Sardinian Autonomous Region in April 2014. Regarding the school projects financed in 2013, for example, it appears that there was a clear preference, in schools, for the use of the LSC orthographic standard together with a local spelling (51%), compared to the exclusive use of the LSC (11%) or the exclusive use of a local spelling (33%).

On the other hand, regarding the editorial projects in Sardinian language in the regional media, financed by the Region in 2012, we find a greater presence of the LSC (which could derive from a reward of 2 points in the formation of the rankings to take funding, a reward that was not present in the notice for schools). According to those data, it appears that 35% of textual production in media projects was in LSC, 35% in LSC and in local spellings and 25% in local spellings only.

The local language offices, co-financed by the Regional Government, in 2012 used LSC in 50% of their writing, LSC together with local spelling for 9% and local spellings for 41%.

A recent research on the use of the LSC orthography in schools, carried out in the municipality of Orosei, showed that the students of the local middle school had no problem using that standard despite the fact that the Sardinian they spoke was partly different. No pupil rejected it or considered it "artificial", a thing that proved its validity as a didactic tool. The results were first presented in 2016 and published in an article in 2021.

Surnames, given names, and toponyms

From the Sardinian language stem both the historical Sardinian given names, which the natives used to confer on each other until contemporary times, as well as most of the traditional surnames still common on the island. Sardinian place names have a very ancient history and, in some cases, have originated a significant debate about their origins.

See also

 Help:IPA/Sardinian
 Paleo-Sardinian language
 Southern Romance
 Traditional writing forms of Sardinian: Logudorese, Campidanese
 Non-Sardinian languages spoken on Sardinia: Sassarese, Gallurese, Algherese, Tabarchino
 Sardinian surnames

References

Notes

Citations

Bibliography
 Argiolas, Mario; Serra, Roberto. 2001. Limba lingua language: lingue locali, standardizzazione e identità in Sardegna nell'era della globalizzazione. Cagliari: CUEC.
 Baroncelli, Stefania; Caretti, Paolo; Rosini, Monica; Louvin, Roberto. 2017. Regioni a statuto speciale e tutela della lingua: Quale apporto per l'integrazione sociale e politica?. Turin: Giappichelli.
 Blasco Ferrer, Eduardo. 2002. Linguistica sarda: Storia, metodi, problemi. Cagliari: Condaghes.
 Blasco Ferrer, Eduardo. 2010. Paleosardo: Le radici linguistiche della Sardegna neolitica. Berlin: De Gruyter.
 Blasco Ferrer, Eduardo; Koch, Peter; Marzo, Daniela. 2017. Manuale di linguistica sarda. Berlin: De Gruyter.
 Bolognesi, Roberto. 1998. The phonology of Campidanian Sardinian: A unitary account of a self-organizing structure. Amsterdam: HIL.
 Bolognesi, Roberto; Heeringa, Wilbert. 2005. Sardegna tra tante lingue: Il contatto linguistico in Sardegna dal Medioevo a oggi. Cagliari: Condaghes.
 Bolognesi, Roberto. 2013. Le identità linguistiche dei sardi. Cagliari: Condaghes, 2013.
 Brigaglia, Manlio. 1982. La Sardegna. 1. La geografia, la storia, l'arte e la letteratura. Cagliari: Edizioni Della Torre.
 Brigaglia, Manlio. 1982. La Sardegna. 2. La cultura popolare, l'economia, l'autonomia. Cagliari: Edizioni Della Torre.
 Cardia, Amos. 2004. Apedala dimòniu!. Cagliari: I Sardi.
 Cardia, Amos. 2006. S'italianu in Sardìnnia. Ghilarza: Iskra.
 Casula, Francesco. 2010. La Lingua sarda e l'insegnamento a scuola. Quartu Sant'Elena: Alfa.
 Casula, Francesco. 2011–2013. Letterature e civiltà della Sardegna. 2 vols. Dolianova: Grafia del Parteolla. ISBN 978-88-96778-61-6.
 Contarini, Silvia; Marras, Margherita; Pias, Giuliana. 2012. L'identità sarda del XXI secolo: Tra globale, locale e postcoloniale. Nuoro: Il Maestrale.
 Contini, Michele. 1987. Etude de géographie phonétique et de phonétique instrumentale du sarde. Alessandria: Edizioni dell'Orso.
 Corongiu, Giuseppe. 2013. Il sardo: Una lingua “normale”: Manuale per chi non ne sa nulla, non conosce la linguistica e vuole saperne di più o cambiare idea. Cagliari: Condaghes. ISBN 978-88-7356-214-6. OCLC 856863696.
 Corongiu, Giuseppe. 2020. A dies de oe. Annotos pro una limba sarda tzìvica e cuntemporànea. Cagliari: Condaghes.
 Farina, Luigi. 1987. Bocabolariu Sardu Nugoresu-Italianu. Sassari: Gallizzi.
 Hubschmid, Johannes. 1953. Sardische Studien: Das mediterrane Substrat des Sardischen, seine Beziehungen zum Berberischen und Baskischen sowie zum eurafrikanischen und hispano-kaukasischen Substrat der romanischen Sprachen. Bern: Francke.
 Ingrassia, Giorgia; Blasco Ferrer, Eduardo. 2009. Storia della lingua sarda. Cagliari: CUEC.
 Jones, Michael Allen. 1988. Sardinian. In Harris, Martin; Vincent, Nigel (eds.), The Romance languages, 314–350. London: Routledge.
 Jones, Michael Allen. 1993. Sardinian syntax. London: Routledge.
 Kamps, Bernd Sebastian; Lepori, Antoni. Sardisch für Mollis & Müslis. 1985. Wuppertal: Steinhäuser.
 Loporcaro, Michele. 2015. Vowel length from Latin to Romance. Oxford University Press.
 Lepori, Antonio. 1980. Vocabolario moderno sardo-italiano: 8400 vocaboli. Cagliari: CUEC.
 Lepori, Antonio. 1983. Zibaldone campidanese. Cagliari: Castello.
 Lepori, Antonio. 1987. Fueddàriu campidanesu de sinònimus e contràrius. Cagliari: Castello.
 Lepori, Antonio. 1988. Dizionario Italiano-Sardo (Campidanese). Cagliari: Castello.
 Lepori, Antonio. 2001. Gramàtiga sarda po is campidanesus. Quart Sant'Elena: C.R.
 Lepori, Antonio. 2005. Stòria lestra de sa literadura sarda. Quartu Sant'Elena: C.R.
 Mameli, Francesco. 1998. Il logudorese e il gallurese. Vilanova Monteleone: Soter.
 Marci, Giuseppe. 2005. In presenza di tutte le lingue del mondo: Letterature sarda. Cagliari: CUEC.
 Marongiu, Maria Antonietta. 2019. Situazione sociolinguistica in Sardegna. In Corsale, Andrea; Sistu, Giovanni (eds.), Sardegna: Geografie di un'isola, 195–214. Milan: Franco Angeli.
 Maxia, Mauro. 2006. Lingua limba linga: Indagine sull'uso dei codici linguistici in tre comuni della Sardegna settentrionale. Cagliari: Condaghes.
 Maxia, Mauro. 2010. La situazione sociolinguistica nella Sardegna settentrionale. In Sa Diversidade de sas Limbas in europa, Itàlia, e Sardigna, Atos de sa cunferèntzia regionale de sa limba sarda, Macumere, 28–30 Santandria 2008. Casteddu: Regione Autònoma de Sardigna.
 Mensching, Guido. 1992. Einführung in die sardische Sprache. Bonn: Romanistischer Verlag.
 Mensching, Guido; Remberger, Eva-Maria. 2016. Sardinian. In Ledgeway, Adam & Maiden, Martin (eds.), The Oxford guide to the Romance languages, 270–291. Oxford University Press.
 Mercurio, Giuseppe. 1997. S'Allega Baroniesa. La parlata Sardo-Baroniese: Fonetica, morfologia, sintassi. Milan: Ghedini.
 Mongili, Alessandro. 2015. Topologie postcoloniali: Innovazione e modernizzazione in Sardegna. Cagliari: Condaghes.
 Mura, Riccardo; Virdis, Maurizio. 2015. Caratteri e strutture fonetiche, fonologiche e prosodiche della lingua sarda. Cagliari: Condaghes.
 Ong, Brenda Man Qing; Perono Cacciafoco, Francesco. 2022. Unveiling the Enigmatic Origins of Sardinian Toponyms. Languages, 7, 2, 131: 1–19, Paper, DOI: https://doi.org/10.3390/languages7020131.
 Paulis, Giulio. 1987. I nomi di luogo della Sardegna. Sassari: Carlo Delfino.
 Paulis, Giulio. 1992. I nomi popolari delle piante in Sardegna: Etimologia, storia, tradizioni. Sassari: Delfino.
 Pili, Marcello. 2004. Novelle lanuseine: poesie, storia, lingua, economia della Sardegna. Ariccia: Legatoria del Sud.
 Pira, Michelangelo. 1984. Sardegna tra due lingue. Cagliari: Della Torre.
 Pittau, Massimo. 1972. Grammatica del sardo-nuorese: Il più conservativo dei parlari neolatini. Bologna: Pàtron.
 Pittau, Massimo. 1991. Grammatica della lingua sarda: Varietà logudorese. Sassari: Delfino.
 Pittau, Massimo. 1997. I nomi di paesi città regioni monti fiumi della Sardegna. Cagliari: Gasperini.
 Pittau, Massimo. 2001. La lingua sardiana o dei protosardi. Cagliari: Gasperini.
 Pittau, Massimo. 2000–2003. Dizionario della lingua sarda: fraseologico ed etimologico. 2 vols. Cagliari: Gasperini.
 Porru, Vincenzo Raimondo. 1811. Saggio di grammatica sul dialetto sardo meridionale. Cagliari: Reale Stamperia.
 Porru, Vincenzo Raimondo. 1832. Nou dizionariu universali sardu-italianu. Casteddu: Tipografia Arciobispali. 
 Rindler Schjerve, Rosita. 2007. Code-switching nel sardo: Un segno di disintegrazioni o ristrutturazione socio-linguistica?. In Iliesci, Maria; Siller, Heidi; Danler, Paul (eds.), Actes du XXVe Congrès International de Philologie et de Linguistique Romanes 7, 207–215. Berlin: De Gruyter.
 Rohlfs, Gerhard. 1970. Le gascon: Études de philologie pyrénéenne. 2nd ed. Tübingen: Max Niemeyer.
 Rubattu, Antonino. 2001–2004. Dizionario universale della lingua di Sardegna. Sassari: Edes.
 Spano, Giovanni. 1840. Ortografia sarda nazionale ossia grammatica della lingua logudorese paragonata all'italiana dal sacerd. professore Giovanni Spano. Cagliari: Reale Stamperia.
 Spano, Giovanni. 1851–1852. Vocabolario sardo-italiano e italiano-sardo coll'aggiunta dei proverbi sardi. 2 vols. Cagliari: Tipografia Nazionale.
 Sugeta, Shigeaki. 2000. Su bocabolariu sinotticu nugoresu-giapponesu-italianu: Sas 1500 paragulas fundamentales de sa limba sarda. Cagliari: Della Torre.
 Sugeta, Shigeaki. 2010. Cento tratti distintivi del sardo tra le lingue romanze: Una proposta. In Iliescu, Maria; Siller, Heidi; Danler, Paul (eds.), Actes du XXVe Congrès International de Philologie et de Linguistique Romanes 7, 217–227. Berlin: De Gruyter.
 Tola, Salvatore. 2006. La letteratura in lingua sarda: Testi, autori, vicende. Cagliari: CUEC.
 Tola, Salvatore. 2006. 50 anni di premi letterari in lingua sarda. Selargius: Domus de Janas. ISBN 88-88569-61-8. OCLC 77504100.
 Virdis, Maurizio. 2019. La Sardegna e la sua lingua: Studi e saggi. Milano: Franco Angeli.
 Wagner, Max Leopold. 1941. Historische Lautlehre des Sardinischen. Halle (Saale): Niemayer.
 Wagner, Max Leopold. 1951. La lingua sarda: Storia, spirito e forma. Berne: Francke.
 Wagner, Max Leopold. 1960–1964. Dizionario etimologico sardo. 3 vols. Heidelberg: Carl Winter.
 Wolf, Heinz Jürgen. 1998. Toponomastica barbaricina: I nomi di luogo dei comuni di Fonni, Gavoi, Lodine, Mamoiada, Oliena, Ollolai, Olzai, Orgòsolo, Ovodda. Nuoro: Insula.

External links

 Ditzionàriu in línia de sa limba e de sa cultura sarda – Online Sardinian Dictionary (in Sardinian, Italian and English)
 CROS – Curretore regionale ortogràficu sardu in lìnia (Sardinian spell checker)
 Apertium. Automatic translation software from Italian and Catalan to Sardinian.
 Grammar of Limba Sarda Comuna (standardized form adopted at institutional level)
 The Sardinian language: Basic phrases & pronunciation, Nativlang
 An extract in Sardinian from The Little Prince (archived 15 March 2018)
 List of Sardinian forenames (from it.wiki)
 Antoninu Rubattu's site. In addition to vocabularies of each Sardinian variety of the language and non-Sardinian languages, the site provides the reader also with some basic grammar guides and etymology dictionaries as well.
 The World Atlas of Language Structures Online, Sardinian
 Lessico etimologico sardo
 SardegnaCultura in sardu – Sardinian version of the official cultural site from the Regional Sardinia administration.
 Apertium. Automatic translation software from Italian to Sardinian.
 University of Berlin  – Contains many links and other information about the language.
 Grammar of Nuorese Sardinian – Wikibooks (English-incomplete)
 Grammar of Nuorese Sardinian – Sardinian Wikipedia (Sardinian-incomplete)
 Grammar of Nuorese Sardinian – Wikibooks (Italian-complete)
 Arrègulas: Grammar of Campidanese Sardinian
 A mailing list for Sardinian-speakers 
 Acadèmia campidanesa de sa lìngua sarda (in Campidanese Sardinian)
 Memorie in lingua sarda, Sardegna Digital Library 
 Interactive Atlas of Romance Intonation, Sardinian from Ittiri and Sinnai

 
Sardinia
Sardinian culture
Languages of Sardinia
Languages of Europe
Languages of Italy
Endangered Romance languages